Penalva do Castelo is a municipality in the district Viseu in Portugal. The population in 2011 was 7,956, in an area of 134.34 km2.

The present mayor is Francisco Lopes de Carvalho, elected by the Socialist Party. The municipal holiday is August 25.

Parishes

Administratively, the municipality is divided into 11 civil parishes (freguesias):
 Antas e Matela
 Castelo de Penalva
 Esmolfe
 Germil

 Ínsua
 Lusinde
 Pindo
 Real
 Sezures
 Trancozelos
 Vila Cova do Covelo e Mareco

References

External links
Municipality official website

Towns in Portugal
Populated places in Viseu District
Municipalities of Viseu District